Karol Sidor (July 16, 1901 – October 20, 1953) was a Slovak nationalist politician and journalist. Active from an early age, he was undecided about full independence and as a result was largely sidelined during the Slovak Republic.

Political activity
A devout Roman Catholic, he was born in Ružomberok in the Liptó County of the Kingdom of Hungary (present-day Slovakia) and came to politics early as a low-level supporter of Andrej Hlinka. He would later write a biography of Hlinka, his political idol. After finishing his education he joined the Slovak People's Party (SPP) and became one of its leading members on the pro-Poland wing. Before long however he would become associated with the Ferdinand Ďurčanský and the Vojtech Tuka wings of the party. He was elected to parliament in 1935 and, ironically given his early ideas, was chosen to argue against Poland's claims on Slovak territory.

Sidor was also commander of the Hlinka Guard and had been touted as a successor to the priest, although this did not happen. He was given the position of Minister for Slovak Affairs by the Czechoslovakian government in 1938, a role which took him away from the radicals of the SPP, allowing Jozef Tiso to take control ahead of him. Wary of Nazi Germany, he rejected a move from Artur Seyss-Inquart to declare independence in 1939, leading to the Nazis concentrating their efforts on Tiso instead. When independence was declared Sidor served as Minister of the Interior for little over a month in 1939 before their pressure forced him out. Sidor was a strong anti-Semite but nevertheless he had reservations about the Nazis and would later serve in only the very minor role of Minister to the Holy See. From January to March 1939 he also a commission to examine the "Jewish question" in Slovakia, although nothing came of this initiative and ultimately the issue would be taken over by the Nazis.

Exile
As the war ended, he left Czechoslovakia for the west, ultimately settling in Montreal, Quebec, Canada. He had initially been refused asylum by the Government of Canada who considered him a persona non grata but they changed their minds in 1950 following the intervention of Pope Pius XII. Sidor had remained in the Vatican and his presence in Rome had become a source of some embarrassment to the Pope given Sidor's conduct in the war. He was sentenced in absentia to 20 years by a Czechoslovak court in 1947.

Sidor received a U.S. passport by 1947.

Sidor died in Canada without serving the sentence.

References

External links
 

1901 births
1953 deaths
People from Ružomberok
People from the Kingdom of Hungary
Slovak Roman Catholics
Slovak People's Party politicians
Government ministers of Czechoslovakia
Members of the Chamber of Deputies of Czechoslovakia (1935–1939)
Prime Ministers of Slovakia
Czechoslovak emigrants to Canada
Slovak emigrants to Canada